Samuel and Pauline Peery House is a historic home located at Albany, Gentry County, Missouri. It was designed by the architect Edmond Jacques Eckel and built in 1901.  It is a -story, Queen Anne style frame dwelling. It has a hipped roof with hipped dormers.  It features a three-story, round tower topped by a bell cast dome and a galleried wraparound porch.  Also on the property is the contributing original carriage house.

It was listed on the National Register of Historic Places in 2005.

References

Buildings and structures in Gentry County, Missouri
Houses completed in 1901
Houses on the National Register of Historic Places in Missouri
National Register of Historic Places in Gentry County, Missouri
Queen Anne architecture in Missouri